The South Korea national handball team is the national handball team of South Korea and is controlled by the Korea Handball Federation.

Competitive record
 Champions   Runners-up

Olympic Games

World Championship

Asian Games record
1982 –  3rd place
1986 –  Champions
1990 –  Champions
1994 –  Champions
1998 –  Champions
2002 –  Champions
2010 –  Champions
2014 –  Runners-up
2018 –  3rd place

Asian Championship
1977 –  Runners-up
1983 –  Champions
1987 –  Champions
1989 –  Champions
1991 –  Champions
1993 –  Champions
1995 –  Runners-up
2000 –  Champions
2002 – 4th place
2006 –  Runners-up
2008 –  Champions
2010 –  Champions
2012 –  Champions
2014 – 5th place
2016 – 6th place
2018 –  3rd place
2020 –  Runners-up
2022 – 5th place

Team

Current squad
Squad for the 2023 World Men's Handball Championship.

Head coach: Rolando Freitas

Assistant Coach: Herlander Silva

Notable players
 Yoon Kyung-shin: 2001 World Handball Player of the Year
 Kang Jae-won: 1989 World Handball Player of the Year, six-time MVP of Swiss Bundesliga

See also
 South Korea women's national handball team

References

External links

IHF profile

Handball in South Korea
Men's national handball teams
Handball